Net Effective Rent, sometimes Net Effective Rate, or NER for short, is a measure of the expected income from a tenant, seen mostly in commercial real estate. It is the net present value of all the rental payments over the period of the lease, as well as any abatements or incentives that might add to or lower these payments. An example of a lowered payment is a month of free rent offered to a tenant as an inducement to renew a lease, or an allowance that can be used to offset the costs of a tenant's improvements to the unit, like new paint. NER contrasts with the "face rent", the agreed rental rate for the space.

Examples
A landlord is looking to attract potential tenants to their apartment building, so they offer a month's free rent for any new lease that is signed for a period of 12 months. In this case the actual rental period is 13 months. If the lease rate is $1,500/month, the so-called face rent, then the total rent paid by the tenant will be 1,500 x 12 = $18,000. Over the 13-month period, this means the net effective rent is $1,385/month.

Similar tenant inducements are often applied to large retail and industrial units as well. However, these are generally longer in term and have more complex inducement schedules. A typical commercial real estate lease is based on a rate that is multiplied by the size of the unit, for instance, $20 per square foot per month, or 20psf/mo. In this case the inducement might be 3 months of free rent every other year.

To calculate the NER in this case, the present value of all future cash flows is summed, and then divided by the number of periods, and then converted to the same units as the face rent. In the example above, in a five-year lease on a 10,000 square foot area, the tenant will pay 20 x 10000 = $200,000 per month x 60 months = $12,000,000 over the period of the lease. However, in year 2 and 4 they receive 3 months free, a total of 6 months x $200,000 per month = $1,200,000 in abatements. Therefore, the NER is (12,000,000 - 1,200,000) / (5 x 12) = $180,000, or $18/psf.

In this case, due to the multi-year contract, one may also discount the future cash flows into today's dollars, which has not been done for this example.

References
 
 

Commercial real estate